Pressed Steel may refer to:
 Pressed Steel Car Company, a former American rolling stock manufacturer
 Pressed Steel Company, a British company manufacturing most British automobile bodies and body panels
 Maryland Pressed Steel Company, an American aircraft manufacturer
 Detroit Pressed Steel Company
 Pressed Steel Car Strike of 1909

See also 
 Stamping (metalworking)
 Stamping press